Count Anton[io] Maria Zanetti (1689–1767) was a Venetian artist, engraver,  art critic, art dealer  and connoisseur. He formed a collection of  engraved gems, of which he published a lavish catalogue.

Life
Zanetti spent his early manhood making wise investments in marine insurance, accumulating sufficient capital to support his true vocation, as a writer and artist, and as an art dealer, doing much of his business with the English aristocrats who passed through Venice on the Grand Tour. He acted as paintings agent for Philippe d'Orléans in forming the Orléans collection, Paris, and Joseph Wenzel I, Prince of Liechtenstein, in expanding the Liechtenstein collection, Vienna. Pierre Crozat, being in Venice in 1715, persuaded Zanetti and his protégé Rosalba Carriera to go to Paris. Zanetti also visited London, where he purchased Jan Petersen Zoomer's three large volumes containing 428 Rembrandt etchings in outstanding impressions of the various states.

He formed a collection of  engraved gems, both Greco-Roman and modern, of which he published a lavish catalogue, in the form of A.F. Gori's Le gemme antiche di Anton Maria Zanetti (1750), illustrated with eighty plates of engravings from his own drawings. The drawings for the engravings, and many of his intaglios and cameos, are conserved in the Museo Correr, Venice. His prize piece, a black cameo of Hadrian's favourite, Antinous, which he had pursued for years before acquiring it, was bought by George Spencer, 4th Duke of Marlborough and gained the sobriquet of the "Marlborough gem".

As a printmaker, Zanetti advanced the art of the Chiaroscuro woodcut, producing many prints after paintings by Parmigianino, Tintoretto and others.

Further reading
The modern monograph on the two Zanettis is Fabio Borroni, I Due Anton Maria Zanetti (Florence, 1956).

Michael Matile, Della Grafica Veneziana: Das Zeitalter Anton Maria Zanettis (1680-1767) (Petersberg, 2016). 
Bozena Anna Kowalczyk, 'Anton Maria Zanetti the Elder and His Time', Print Quarterly, Vol.XXXV No.1 March 2018, pp. 98-101.

Notes

External links 
 

1680 births
1757 deaths
Italian engravers
Italian art collectors
Italian art historians